In sociology, intragroup conflict (or infighting) refers to conflict between two or more members of the same group or team. In recent years, intragroup conflict has received a large amount of attention in conflict and group dynamics literature. This increase in interest in studying intragroup conflict may be a natural corollary of the ubiquitous use of work groups and work teams across all levels of organizations, including decision-making task forces, project groups, or production teams. Jehn identified two main types of intragroup conflict: task conflict and relationship (or emotional) conflict (e.g., differences in personal values).

Antecedents 
There are a number of antecedents of intragroup conflict. While not an exhaustive list, researchers have identified a number of antecedents of intragroup conflict, including low task or goal uncertainty, increased group size, increased diversity (i.e., gender, age, race), lack of information sharing, and high task interdependence.

Measuring 
Jehn developed the Intragroup Conflict Scale (ICS) to measure the two types of intragroup conflicts (i.e., task and relationship conflict). The ICS consists of eight 7-point Likert scale items which assess intragroup conflict. This scale has been applied in a number of contexts including decision making groups and groups in the moving industry. Furthermore, this scale has high construct and predictive validity.

Group outcomes 
A recent meta-analysis of 116 empirical studies, examining 8,880 groups, revealed a complex relationship between intragroup conflict and group outcomes. That is, effects of intragroup conflict on group performance or outcome is moderated by a number of factors including the context under which it is examined and the type of outcome. One of the prominent findings from the meta-analysis is that task conflict has a less negative relationship (and at times even positive) with group performance and outcomes than believed previously. The results also showed that intragroup conflict is not always negative or detrimental to group performance; for example, task conflict has been related positively to group performance and outcomes when such conflict occurs in management groups.

See also 
 Group conflict
 Narcissism of small differences
 Vote-splitting

References 

Group processes